Aran is a village and municipality in the Lerik Rayon of Azerbaijan.  It has a population of 417.  The municipality consists of the villages of Aran, Lələdulan, and Musavar.

References 

Populated places in Lerik District